Huasco River is a river of Chile located in the Huasco Province, Atacama Region. Its headwaters in the upper catchments in high-altitude Andes glaciers are the Estrecho River, a tributary of El Tránsito River (catchment area 4,135 km2), and Potrerillos River, a tributary of El Carmen River (catchment area 2 890 km2). The Huasco River begins at the confluence of El Tránsito River and El Carmen River which is located in Junta del Carmen (790ma.s.l.). A small portion of its course is impounded by a small dam forming the Embalse Santa Juana.

Cities and towns along the Huasco include: Vallenar, Freirina and Huasco.

Andean glaciers and the Huasco River Basin

The inhabitants of the Huasco valley, a semi-arid region, depend on water resources from the upper catchments in high-altitude Andes glaciers which contribution to the discharge of two Huasco River headwaters: the Estrecho River and the Potrerillos River which arise from two small neighboring catchments, they actually belong to two major subcatchments of the Huasco Basin.

A collaborative study between the Centro de Estudios Avanzados en Zonas Áridas (CEAZA) and the Laboratoire de Glaciologie et Géophysique de l'Environnement (LGGE) investigated the glacier contribution to the Huasco River basins by two glaciated headwater catchments which included the monitoring of five Andean glaciers (Toro 1, Toro 2, Esperanza, Guanaco, Estrecho and Ortigas) between 2003/2004 and 2007/2008 hydrological years. The Andean "glaciers accelerated retreat" represents a "striking example of climate change impacts."

Concerns were raised by Sustainable Chile Program president, Sara Larraín, a Chilean politician and environmentalist who ran for president in 1999 presidential election, that the Andean glaciers, particularly Toro 1, Toro 2 and Esperanza, were endangered by the Pascua Lama project.

In May 2013, Chile's Superintendence of the Environment Superintendencia del Medio Ambiente (SMA) notified Barrick Gold that the company had to cease construction activities at Pascua-Lama until they complete water management system in accordance with the project's environmental permit. Barrick Gold  was also fined approximately $16 million for noncompliance regarding the project's water management system.

See also
 List of rivers of Chile

References

External links
 Cuenca del Río Huasco, Dirección General de Aguas, Ministerio de Obras Públicas, Gobierno de Chile

Rivers of Atacama Region
Rivers of Chile